Uthamsevi  is a village in the Srirangam taluk of Tiruchirappalli district in Tamil Nadu, India.

Demographics 

As per the 2001 census, Uthamsevi had a population of 2,009 with 993 males and 1,016 females. The sex ratio was 1023 and the literacy rate, 79.23.

References 

 

Villages in Tiruchirappalli district